The Rezvani Tank is a mid-size SUV produced by Rezvani Motors since 2017. It is designed to be a military style truck for on road use.

First generation

Rezvani unveiled the first generation Tank in November 2017. Around this time, Rezvani decided to cooperate with Jeep, which resulted in the off-road and high-performance Tank model developed on the Wrangler's technical components.

The first generation of the vehicle features a raw, combat aesthetic combining the edges with clearly defined wheel arches and aggressively styled details of the body. The rear part of the body is decorated with a hump with high placed lamps made in LED technology, while the characteristic solution is the door that opens apart. The drive was powered by a 6.4 L 500 HP V8 engine, which worked with a manually controlled AWD drive and an automatic transmission.

Second generation

Rezvani unveiled the second generation Tank in 2019. Two years after the premiere of the first generation Tank, whose debut was quickly covered by the debut of a completely new generation Wrangler, Rezvani decided to build a completely new, second incarnation of its off-road SUV, which was based on the JL model.

Compared to its predecessor, the second generation Tank gained a more voluminous body with a more muscular silhouette, which became longer and this time enriched with the traditionally opening rear doors. While maintaining the same proportions, the exterior details and the appearance of individual parts have been completely redesigned. Standard equipment was also extensively enriched.

Like its predecessor, the second generation Tank was distinguished by high-performance driving characteristics thanks to a sporty power unit. This time, the 6.2 L V8 Hemi engine from the Dodge Challenger has been revised to reach 1000hp instead of the base 840hp. In addition, the offer also included a weaker V6 with 285 hp.

References

Tank
All-wheel-drive vehicles
Rear-wheel-drive vehicles
Mid-size sport utility vehicles
Cars introduced in 2017
2020s cars